The canton of Falaise is an administrative division of the Calvados department, northwestern France. It was created at the French canton reorganisation which came into effect in March 2015. Its seat is in Falaise.

It consists of the following communes:

Aubigny
Barou-en-Auge
Beaumais
Bernières-d'Ailly
Bonnœil
Bons-Tassilly
Cordey
Courcy
Crocy
Damblainville
Le Détroit
Épaney
Eraines
Ernes
Falaise
Fontaine-le-Pin
Fourches
Fourneaux-le-Val
Fresné-la-Mère
La Hoguette
Les Isles-Bardel
Jort
Leffard
Les Loges-Saulces
Louvagny
Maizières
Le Marais-la-Chapelle
Martigny-sur-l'Ante
Le Mesnil-Villement
Morteaux-Coulibœuf
Les Moutiers-en-Auge
Noron-l'Abbaye
Norrey-en-Auge
Olendon
Ouilly-le-Tesson
Perrières
Pertheville-Ners
Pierrefitte-en-Cinglais
Pierrepont
Pont-d'Ouilly
Potigny
Rapilly
Rouvres
Saint-Germain-Langot
Saint-Martin-de-Mieux
Saint-Pierre-Canivet
Saint-Pierre-du-Bû
Sassy
Soulangy
Soumont-Saint-Quentin
Tréprel
Ussy
Versainville
Vicques
Vignats
Villers-Canivet
Villy-lez-Falaise

References

Cantons of Calvados (department)